Wang Lian (died  223), courtesy name Wenyi, was an official of the state of Shu Han in the Three Kingdoms period of China.

Life
Wang Lian was from Nanyang Commandery, which is around present-day Nanyang, Henan. He entered Yi Province (covering present-day Sichuan and Chongqing) sometime between 194 and 214 in the late Eastern Han dynasty, when Liu Zhang was the Governor of Yi Province. He served as the Prefect of Zitong County under Liu Zhang during this time.

Between 212 and 214, the warlord Liu Bei engaged Liu Zhang in a war for control of Yi Province. When Liu Bei's forces attacked Zitong County, Wang Lian ordered his troops to hide behind the city walls and close the gates, and refused to surrender to Liu Bei. Liu Bei admired Wang Lian for his loyalty towards Liu Zhang, so he called off the attack on Zitong County.

In 214, after Liu Bei successfully conquered Yi Province, he recruited most, if not all, of Liu Zhang's former subordinates to serve in his administration. During this time, he appointed Wang Lian as the Prefect of Shifang County and later reassigned him to be the Prefect of Guangdu County (廣都縣; northeast of present-day Shuangliu District, Chengdu, Sichuan). Wang Lian performed well in office and was later promoted to Colonel of the Salt Office to oversee and regulate the production and trade of salt and iron. Under Wang Lian's leadership, the Salt Office gained a lot of revenue for Liu Bei's administration through profits and taxes. At the same time, Wang Lian also identified some of his subordinates with great potential, such as Lü Yi, Du Qi and Liu Gan, and promoted them or recommended them to serve in higher positions. He was later given additional appointments as the Administrator of Shu Commandery (蜀郡; centred around present-day Chengdu, Sichuan) and General of Revival.

In 223, after Liu Shan became the emperor of the Shu Han state, Wang Lian was appointed as a Colonel of the Garrison Cavalry and as the Chief Clerk of Zhuge Liang, the Imperial Chancellor. He was also enfeoffed as the Marquis of Pingyang Village.

Sometime between 223 and 224, when rebellions broke out in the Nanzhong region of southern Shu, Zhuge Liang wanted to personally lead the Shu army on a campaign to quell the revolts and pacify the region. Wang Lian strongly objected and said that Zhuge Liang, given his important status, should not undertake the risk of going into the dangerous Nanzhong region. As Zhuge Liang was worried that none of the Shu generals was sufficiently competent for this task, he insisted on personally leading the campaign. However, Wang Lian's sincerity did make Zhuge Liang reconsider many times before he finalised his decision to go on the campaign in early 225.

Wang Lian died not long later, probably around 223. After his death, his son, Wang Shan, inherited his marquis title and marquisate. Like his father, Wang Shan served as an official in Shu and the highest appointment he held was Administrator of Jiangyang Commandery (江陽郡; around present-day Neijiang, Sichuan).

See also
 Lists of people of the Three Kingdoms

References

 Chen, Shou (3rd century). Records of the Three Kingdoms (Sanguozhi).
 Pei, Songzhi (5th century). Annotations to Records of the Three Kingdoms (Sanguozhi zhu).
 Sima, Guang (1084). Zizhi Tongjian.

Year of birth unknown
223 deaths
Shu Han politicians
Officials under Liu Bei
Politicians from Nanyang, Henan
Han dynasty politicians from Henan
Liu Zhang and associates